Robert Lenkinski (born 1947) is a Canadian scientist, currently the Charles A. and Elizabeth Ann Sanders Chair in Translational Research and works as a Professor in Medical Science at University of Texas Southwestern Medical Center.

References

1947 births
Living people
University of Texas faculty
21st-century American chemists
University of Toronto alumni
University of Houston alumni
Physicians from Texas